Jessica Shattuck is an American author. Her debut novel, The Hazards of Good Breeding, was a finalist for the L.L. Winship/PEN New England Award
 and a New York Times notable book, both in 2003. She subsequently published the novel Perfect Life, in 2009. Her third novel, The Women in the Castle (2017), became a New York Times best seller.

Life 
Shattuck graduated from Harvard University in 1994, and received her MFA from Columbia University in 2001.

Works 
The Hazards of Good Breeding, New York: W.W. Norton, 2003. , 
Perfect Life: A Novel, New York: W.W. Norton & Co., 2009. , 
The Women in the Castle, London: Zaffre, 2017. ,

References

External links
 Official website
 Jessica Shattuck on goodreads.com

Year of birth missing (living people)
Living people
Harvard University alumni
Columbia University School of the Arts alumni
21st-century American women writers